The Palais 12 (French) or Paleis 12 (Dutch) is an indoor arena in Brussels, Belgium, used for concerts and spectacles. With a capacity of roughly 15,000 it is one of the largest indoor venues in the country. Located on the Heysel/Heizel Plateau, it was originally built in 1989 but was redesigned and reopened in its current form in 2013.

The Palais 12 forms the foundation stone for the NEO project, which aims to refurbish the Heysel Plateau into a new, modern, multipurpose neighbourhood in northern Brussels.

Accessibility
The Palais 12 is circumscribed by the /, the /, the /, the /, the /, the / and the /. This site is served by Heysel/Heizel metro station on line 6 of the Brussels Metro.

Notable concerts and events
In 2016, the Dalai Lama was a guest at an event at the Palais 12. The Music Industry Awards have been presented annually in the hall since 2017. The 2017 Davis Cup World Group semifinals saw the Belgium Davis Cup team play Australia on 15–17 September. The hosts at the Palais 12 won the game 3–2 on clay.

The Palais was one of nine venues for the 2019 Men's European Volleyball Championship alongside Belgium, France, Netherlands and Slovenia.

Other notable concerts and events held in the arena include:
 2013: David Guetta; Mylène Farmer; Elton John; Indochine; Riverdance
 2014: Stromae; Scorpions; Kylie Minogue; Drake; André Rieu; Il Divo; Peter Gabriel; Calogero; John Newman; Elbow, Cliff Richards
 2015: 5 Seconds of Summer; Ennio Morricone; Nicki Minaj; Johnny Hallyday; Santana; Eros Ramazzotti; Major Lazer; André Rieu; Supertramp; Oscar and the Wolf; Violetta; Shaka Ponk; Editors; The Prodigy; Faithless; 2015 League of Legends World Championship Soy Luna Live;
 2016: Massive Attack; Muse; Queen + Adam Lambert
 2017: Martina Stoessel
 2019: Nicki Minaj; Take That; Twenty One Pilots

See also
 Brussels Expo
 List of indoor arenas in Belgium

References

External links

  

Buildings and structures in Brussels
Sports venues in Brussels
City of Brussels
Culture in Brussels
Indoor arenas in Belgium
Event venues established in 1989
1989 establishments in Belgium